Neitzel is a surname. Notable people with the surname include:

Charles Neitzel (1853–1938), American farmer and politician
Drew Neitzel (born 1985), American professional basketball player
Enrico Neitzel (born 1977), German football striker
Karl Neitzel (1901–1966), German U-boat commander in World War II
Karsten Neitzel (born 1967), German footballer and manager
Otto Neitzel (1852–1920), German composer and pianist, music writer
Robert S. Neitzel (1911–1980), American archaeologist
Rüdiger Neitzel (born 1963), West German handball player
Sönke Neitzel (born 1968), German historian
Tyler Neitzel (born 1991), American actor

See also
Vila Neitzel, geographical district in the Brazilian municipality of Itueta, founded by Pomeranians